Cáterin Bravo (born 28 December 1978) is a Chilean fencer. She competed in the women's individual épée event at the 2000 Summer Olympics. She also competed at the women's Individual épée event at the 2012 Summer Olympics.

References

External links
 

1978 births
Living people
Chilean female épée fencers
Olympic fencers of Chile
Fencers at the 2000 Summer Olympics
Fencers at the 2012 Summer Olympics
Fencers at the 2011 Pan American Games
Pan American Games competitors for Chile
20th-century Chilean women
21st-century Chilean women